Allan Reddon (born 20 May 1962) is a Canadian gymnast. He competed in eight events at the 1984 Summer Olympics.

References

External links
 

1962 births
Living people
Canadian male artistic gymnasts
Olympic gymnasts of Canada
Gymnasts at the 1984 Summer Olympics
Sportspeople from Edmonton